Kim Sung-won (born February 21, 1984), better known by his stage name Sleepy (Hangul: 슬리피), is a South Korean rapper and a television personality. He is a member of the hip hop boy duo Untouchable. He released his solo debut single, "Cool Night", on June 16, 2015. He became a household name after appearing on reality TV shows like Real Man, I Live Alone, Law of the Jungle, and We Got Married.

TS Entertainment lawsuit
On September 14, 2019, it was revealed that Sleepy had filed a lawsuit to terminate his contract with TS Entertainment, citing lack of trust after they refused to show him payment documents and a physical copy of his contract. Sleepy also said that he did not receive any payment for his activities until 10 years after his contract was signed. TS later denied these statements, saying all of Sleepy's claims were "false" and that he embezzled funds from the company, which Sleepy denied. The next day, it was announced TS Entertainment was forwarded to prosecution for overdue payments of artists.

Personal life 
Sleepy planned to marry his girlfriend on October 10, 2021, however he postponed the wedding due to the Covid-19 pandemic. Later in March 2022, Sleepy announced that he would marry his non-celebrity girlfriend on April 9, 2022.

Discography

Singles

Filmography

Television shows

Web shows

Music video appearances

Awards and nominations

References

Living people
1984 births
South Korean male rappers
TS Entertainment artists
Show Me the Money (South Korean TV series) contestants